Gregorio Luperini (born 10 February 1994) is an Italian footballer who plays for Serie B club Perugia.

Club career
Born in Pisa, Tuscany, Luperini moved to Genoa for Serie A club Sampdoria at young age. In 2013, he was signed by Lega Pro club Pontedera in a temporary deal. on 2 July 2014 he was signed by Pontedera on a free transfer.

On 15 July 2015 Luperini was signed by defending Serie A champions Juventus for €100,000 transfer fee. He signed a 3-year contract. Luperini was immediately left for Serie B club Pro Vercelli. In January 2016 Luperini returned to Pontedera .

In July 2016 Luperini was signed another third-tier club Cremonese. He received number 14 shirt of the first team. Luperini made his competitive debut for the club in the third round of Italian Cup, as a substitute of Simone Pesce.

However, on 31 August Luperini left for another Lega Pro club Pistoiese in another loan. He changed to wear no.17 shirt for Pistoiese.

On 17 July 2019, he signed a two-year contract with Serie B club Trapani. After playing a full season with Trapani, he was released for free following the club's exclusion from professional football. Shortly thereaftere, he joined Serie C club Palermo on a free transfer.

After two seasons with Palermo, the last of which ended with the Rosanero achieving promotion to Serie B through playoffs, on 18 August 2022 Luperini transferred to Perugia, reuniting with his former Trapani coach Fabrizio Castori.

Career statistics

Club

References

Italian footballers
U.C. Sampdoria players
U.S. Città di Pontedera players
F.C. Pro Vercelli 1892 players
U.S. Cremonese players
U.S. Pistoiese 1921 players
Trapani Calcio players
Palermo F.C. players
A.C. Perugia Calcio players
Serie B players
Serie C players
Association football midfielders
Italy youth international footballers
Sportspeople from Pisa
1994 births
Living people
Footballers from Tuscany